Christopher Thomas Ault (born November 8, 1946) is a former American football player, coach, and college athletics administrator. He served three stints at the head football coach at the University of Nevada, Reno (1976–1992, 1994–1995 and 2004–2012), leading the Nevada Wolf Pack to a record of 234–108–1 over 28 seasons and guiding the program from the NCAA's Division II to Division I-AA in 1978 and then to Division I-A in 1992. Ault was also the athletic director at Nevada from 1986 to 2004. He was the school's starting quarterback from 1965 to 1968. He is a former consultant for the Kansas City Chiefs of the National Football League (NFL). Ault was inducted into the College Football Hall of Fame as a coach in 2002, seven years after his first retirement from coaching in 1995. He also coached in the Italian Football League.

Coaching career
After the 2004 season, Ault fired head coach Chris Tormey. He named himself as the replacement three days later, with the approval of school president John Lilley and the Nevada Board of Regents. A member of the university's faculty senate expressed concern at the perceived conflict of interest, especially because the salary of head football coach exceeded that of athletic director.

Ault is credited as the creator of the "Pistol Offense", which he instituted at Nevada in 2004. Since becoming the primary offense for Nevada, the Pistol has been used by other schools across the country. The San Francisco 49ers began employing the pistol offense with the emergence of former Nevada quarterback Colin Kaepernick. Since installing the Pistol, Nevada has won shares of two WAC titles—in 2005 (with Boise State) and 2010 (with Boise State and Hawaii).

Ault won his 200th college football game October 9, 2009 when his Wolf Pack beat Louisiana Tech, 37–14.

On December 28, 2012, Ault announced his retirement, effective at the end of the year. In an emotional press conference, Ault said the time had come to pass the program to a new coach. He had spent 41 years―all but seven years of his adult life―at Nevada as a player, coach or administrator.

Italian Football League

On September 17, 2015, Rhinos Milano announced Ault as new head coach for the 2016 season. On July 9, 2016, he won the Italian Football League Italian Bowl Championship after an undefeated season and a 13 games win streak.  Ault led the Rhinos to the Italian Bowl championship game again in 2017 but this time lost to Seamen Milano, 37–29.

Education and family
Ault graduated from St. Catherine's Academy in Anaheim, California, graduated from University of Nevada, Reno with a bachelor's degree in education in 1968 and went on to complete an M.B.A. in 1971. He is married to Kathy Ault and has three children: Lisa, Chris Jr., and Amy.

Head coaching record

College

See also
 List of college football coaches with 200 wins
 List of college football head coaches with non-consecutive tenure

Notes

References

External links
 
 Nevada profile

1946 births
Living people
American football quarterbacks
Nevada Wolf Pack athletic directors
Nevada Wolf Pack football coaches
Nevada Wolf Pack football players
UNLV Rebels football coaches
High school football coaches in Nevada
College Football Hall of Fame inductees
Sportspeople from San Bernardino, California
American expatriate players of American football
American expatriate sportspeople in Italy